Kazimierz Wiesław Szczerba (born 4 March 1954 in Ciężkowice) is a retired amateur Polish boxer, who won a Light Welterweight Bronze medal at the 1976 Summer Olympics and a Welterweight Bronze medal at the 1980 Summer Olympics.

In 1976, Szczerba lost on points to eventual gold medal winner Sugar Ray Leonard of the United States. In 1980, he lost on points to John Mugabi of Uganda in the semifinals.

Defeated Kebede Sahilu (Ethiopia) 5-0
Defeated Ionel Budusan (Romania) TKO 2
Lost to John Mugabi (Uganda) 2-3

References

1954 births
Boxers at the 1976 Summer Olympics
Boxers at the 1980 Summer Olympics
Olympic boxers of Poland
Olympic bronze medalists for Poland
Living people
Olympic medalists in boxing
People from Tarnów County
Sportspeople from Lesser Poland Voivodeship
Polish male boxers
Medalists at the 1980 Summer Olympics
Medalists at the 1976 Summer Olympics
Welterweight boxers